Kim Jong-man (born 16 December 1972) is a North Korean former footballer. He represented North Korea on at least two occasions in 1993. He also represented North Korea at the 1990 AFC Youth Championship, and the unified Korean team at the 1991 FIFA World Youth Championship.

Career statistics

International

References

1972 births
Living people
North Korean footballers
North Korea youth international footballers
North Korea international footballers
Association football midfielders